Stridsyfirlysing is an album by the Swedish black metal band Vondur. It was released in 1995 by Necropolis Records.  The title means "Declaration of War" in Icelandic.

The booklet contains a modification of the "Stop the Madness Campaign" against the use of hard drugs, used by Roadrunner Records in the 1980s. "Never Stop the Madness: Drugs are no fun. Drugs endanger the life and happiness of millions. It must never stop. We appeal in particular to the youth of today. Don't stop the madness. There are better things in life.

Vondur support the never stop the madness campaigns for the use of hard drugs. Join us."

Vondur plays untuned.

The album cover artwork contains an image of Darth Vader along with a squad of imperial stormtroopers.

Track listing
  "Kynning - Einvaldnir Er Her"   – 1:24  
  "Dreptu Allur"  – 1:45  
  "Uppruni Vonsku"  – 3:36  
  "Kynning - Fjoroi Riku"  – 4:12  
  "Fjordi Rikins Uppgangur"  – 3:26  
  "I Eldur Og Drumur"  – 2:57  
  "Vondur"  – 2:38  
  "Hrafnins Auga Er Sem Speglar A Botni Af Satans Svartasalur"  – 3:17  
  "Eitt Bergmal Ur Framtidinnar Dagar"  – 3:38  
  "Kirkjur Skola Brenna"  – 2:03  
  "Sigurskrift"  – 2:29  
  "Gud Er Dajnn"  – 3:17  
  "Ekki Krist - Opinberun I & II"  – 3:31  
  "Eg Daemi Oss Til Dauda"  – 2:57  
  "Ekki Nein Verdur Saklaus"  – 2:00  
  "Beitir Hnifar Skera Djufur"  – 3:29  
  "Hofdingi Satan"  – 3:07

Credits
 It (Tony Särkkä) - All guitars, bass guitar, vocals on track 16, violin, talk, additional vocals on tracks 2, 9, 12, handwriting 
 All (Jim Berger) - Vocals, talk on track 7
 Irata - Drums
 Michael Bohlin - Synthesizers
 Desire - Female talk, photos
 Alexandra Balogh - Piano on tracks 7, 17, Logo design

References

1995 albums